Coming Soon is a 2014 Turkish comedy film directed by Cem Yılmaz.

Cast
Cem Yılmaz as Zafer Yildiz/Besir
Tülin Özen as Arzu
Ozan Güven as Bogac Boray 
Özkan Uğur as Ejder
Zafer Algöz as Ahben
Çağlar Çorumlu as Zeki
Ayşen Gruda as Remziye

References

External links

2014 comedy-drama films
Turkish comedy-drama films
Warner Bros. films